T26 was a trimaran sailboat designed by Victor Tchetchet in the very late 1940s or early in 1950. It was the predecessor to his later craft Egg Nog.

T26 was entered into the 1950 One of a Kind Series and placed 21st.

The design was enhanced for Tchetchet's subsequent vessel Egg Nog.

See also
List of multihulls
Egg Nog
Egg Nog II
Victor Tchetchet

References

Trimarans